Sybra subproximatoides is a species of beetle in the family Cerambycidae. It was described by Breuning and Villiers in 1983.

References

subproximatoides
Beetles described in 1983